Bobby Hunt (born 4 September 1934) is an English footballer, who played as a wing half in the Football League for Chester.

References

Chester City F.C. players
Wrexham A.F.C. players
Pwllheli F.C. players
Association football wing halves
English Football League players
1934 births
Living people
Footballers from Liverpool
English footballers